Outertimeinnerspace is a live album by American jazz pianist Ahmad Jamal featuring performances recorded at the Montreux Jazz Festival in 1971 for the Impulse! label.  Additional performances from this concert were released as Freeflight in 1971.

Critical reception
The Allmusic review by Jason Ankeny awarded the album four stars, calling it "a challenging but deeply rewarding effort that captures the pianist at his most profoundly spiritual, exploring otherworldly dimensions of space and sound".

Track listing
All compositions by Ahmad Jamal unless noted.
 "Bogota" (Richard Evans) – 17:00  
 "Extensions" – 19:35  
Recorded at the Montreux Jazz Festival in the Casino De Montreux in Switzerland on June 17, 1971

Personnel
Ahmad Jamal – piano, electric piano
Jamil Nasser – bass
Frank Gant – drums

References 

Impulse! Records live albums
Ahmad Jamal live albums
1972 live albums
albums recorded at the Montreux Jazz Festival